The Boston University Terriers men's basketball team is the basketball team that represents Boston University in Boston, Massachusetts, United States. The school's team currently competes in the Patriot League.

Postseason results

NCAA tournament results
The Terriers have appeared in the NCAA tournament seven times. Their overall tournament record is 2–7.

NIT results
The Terriers have appeared in the National Invitation Tournament (NIT) six times. Their overall tournament record is 0–6.

CBI results
The Terriers have appeared in the College Basketball Invitational (CBI) two times. Their overall tournament record is 3–2.

CIT results
The Terriers have appeared in the CollegeInsider.com Postseason Tournament (CIT) two times. Their overall tournament record is 1–2.

Awards and honors

Retired numbers

Player awards
America East Men's Basketball Player of the Year
Larry Jones (1988)
Steven Key (1990)
Tunji Awojobi (1997)
John Holland (2011)
Darryl Partin (2012)

America East Men's Basketball Rookie of the Year
Mike Alexander (1983)
Tunji Awojobi (1994)
Raja Bell (1995)
Paul Seymour (2000)
Tyler Morris (2007)
John Holland (2008)
Jake O'Brien (2009)

America East Men's Basketball Defensive Player of the Year
Shaun Wynn (2004)

America East Men's Basketball Coach of the Year
Mike Jarvis (1990)
Dennis Wolff (1997, 2003, 2004)

References

External links